In real algebraic geometry, Krivine–Stengle  (German for "positive-locus-theorem") characterizes polynomials that are positive on a semialgebraic set, which is defined by systems of inequalities of polynomials with real coefficients, or more generally, coefficients from any real closed field.

It can be thought of as a real analogue of Hilbert's Nullstellensatz (which concern complex zeros of polynomial ideals), and this analogy is at the origin of its name. It was proved by French mathematician  and then rediscovered by the Canadian .

Statement

Let  be the semialgebraic set

where Σ2[1,...,] is the set of sum-of-squares polynomials.

Let  ∈ [1,...,] be a polynomial. Krivine–Stengle Positivstellensatz states that

(i)  if and only if  and  such that .

(ii)  if and only if  such that  .

Then

if and only if

(Unlike , the "weak" form actually includes the "strong" form as a special case, so the terminology is a misnomer.)

Variants 
The Krivine–Stengle Positivstellensatz also has the following refinements under additional assumptions. It should be remarked that Schmüdgen's Positivstellensatz has a weaker assumption than Putinar's Positivstellensatz, but the conclusion is also weaker.

Schmüdgen's Positivstellensatz 
Suppose that . Here  is said to be strictly positive on  if  for all .

Putinar's Positivstellensatz 

 

Assume there exists L > 0  such that the polynomial  If  for all , then  ∈.

See also
 Positive polynomial for other positivstellensatz theorems.

Notes

References

Real algebraic geometry
Algebraic varieties
German words and phrases
Theorems in algebraic geometry